James Frank Gillespie (April 18, 1869 – November 26, 1954) was a U.S. Representative from Illinois.

Born in White Sulphur Springs, Greenbrier County, West Virginia, Gillespie attended the graded schools and Concord Normal School.
He taught in the public schools at White Sulphur Springs, W.Virginia, in 1891 and 1892.
Principal of White Sulphur Springs High School in 1891.
He studied law at Central College, Danville, Indiana.
He was admitted to the bar in 1892 and commenced practice in Charleston, West Virginia.
He moved to Bloomington, McLean County, Illinois, in 1894 and continued the practice of law.
He also engaged in agricultural pursuits.
He served in the Illinois House of Representatives in 1913 and 1914.

Gillespie was elected as a Democrat to the Seventy-third Congress (March 4, 1933 – January 3, 1935).
He was an unsuccessful candidate for reelection in 1934 to the Seventy-fourth Congress and for election in 1936 to the Seventy-fifth Congress.
He resumed the practice of law in Bloomington, Illinois, until his death there on November 26, 1954.
He was interred in Park Hill Cemetery.

References

1869 births
1954 deaths
19th-century American lawyers
20th-century American lawyers
American school administrators
Concord University alumni
Illinois lawyers
Democratic Party members of the Illinois House of Representatives
People from Bloomington, Illinois
Politicians from Charleston, West Virginia
People from White Sulphur Springs, West Virginia
West Virginia lawyers
Democratic Party members of the United States House of Representatives from Illinois
Lawyers from Charleston, West Virginia
Educators from Illinois